Nicaragua competed at the 1972 Summer Olympics in Munich, West Germany.

Results by event

Athletics
Men's 800 metres
Francisco Menocal
 Heat — 1:58.6 (→ did not advance)

Boxing
Men's Flyweight (– 51 kg)
 Salvador Miranda
 First Round — Lost to Arturo Delgado (MEX), TKO-3

References
Official Olympic Reports

Nations at the 1972 Summer Olympics
1972
1972 in Nicaraguan sport